Zahid Razzak is a former Bangladeshi cricketer who played in 3 ODIs from 1988 to 1990.
After scores of 6,4,4, his ODI career ended. He also failed in two International Cricket Council trophy tournaments (in 1986 &  in 1990). Nevertheless, he was more successful in the lower tiers of the game.

References

Bangladesh One Day International cricketers
Bangladeshi cricketers
Living people
1967 births
People from Chittagong